Church Village Halt railway station was a small halt on the Llantrisant and Taff Vale Junction Railway. The station was just south of the crossroads in the village on the road to Efail Isaf.

The station consisted of a single platform and station buildings to the immediate west of Station Road, which crossed the railway on a small bridge. To the immediate east of the bridge were sidings and a tramway to Taff Llantwit colliery. A signal box operated the sidings at the site.

Modern day
The site of the station is now covered with housing development. The area of the sidings to the east of the station is open ground used for keeping animals. No trace remains of the tramway and colliery being built over in 2006–2007 with modern housing, though even before this little trace existed.

References

External links

Disused railway stations in Rhondda Cynon Taf
Former Taff Vale Railway stations
Railway stations in Great Britain opened in 1887
Railway stations in Great Britain closed in 1952